The Masonic Temple in Kent, Ohio is a historic building which is listed on the National Register of Historic Places.  Built between 1880 and 1882 in the Italianate style, it was originally the home of Kent namesake Marvin Kent and his family.  Construction was performed partially by locals and partly by master craftsmen from afar: the architect was Isaac Tuttle of neighboring Ravenna, but interior woodworking was performed by woodworkers brought from New York City.  Members of Kent's family lived at the house for slightly more than forty years before selling it to a Masonic lodge in 1923.  Due to Marvin Kent's national prominence in the Republican Party, many political leaders visited his house, including Presidents Benjamin Harrison, William McKinley, William Howard Taft, and Warren G. Harding; the guest room in which every president slept has been named the "President's Room" and preserved in its late nineteenth-century condition.

Built of brick on a foundation of sandstone, the Masonic Temple features miscellaneous elements of wood and sandstone placed under a slate roof.  A brick wall is placed in front of the house, which features a wrap-around porch with a small pediment.  The house's walls rise two and a half stories, with a taller tower at the center of the facade; the eaves under the tall pointed roof are supported by a cornice composed of dentilling.

It was listed on the National Register in 1974 and is also a contributing structure of the West Main Street District, listed on the NRHP in 1977.

See also
 History of Kent, Ohio
 National Register of Historic Places listings in Portage County, Ohio

References

External links

 Rockton Masonic Lodge #316

National Register of Historic Places in Portage County, Ohio
History of Kent, Ohio
Clubhouses on the National Register of Historic Places in Ohio
Masonic buildings in Ohio
Buildings and structures in Portage County, Ohio